Jens Tvedt (14 June 1857 – 3 September 1935) was a Norwegian novelist and writer of short stories. He was born in Kvinnherad. He made his literary debut in 1885 with the short story collection Inn i Fjordane. In his stories he often depicts everyday life of farmers from Western Norway. A bust of Tvedt, sculptured by Ståle Kyllingstad, was unveiled in Stavanger in 1932. He was biographized by Arne Espeland in 1959.

Selected works

Further reading

References

External links 

Digitized books by Tvedt in the National Library of Norway

1857 births
1935 deaths
People from Hordaland
People from Kvinnherad
19th-century Norwegian novelists
20th-century Norwegian novelists